The Baptist Union of Denmark is a national organization of Baptists in Denmark for promoting cooperation in missions, charitable work, and education.

The first work in Denmark generally considered Baptist began in 1836 when Julius Köbner, a Danish Jew, visited Hamburg, Germany and met some individuals with Baptist views. Köbner was an associate and co-worker of Johann Gerhard Oncken (1800–1884), often considered the father of European Baptists. Oncken baptized these believers and established a church in Copenhagen in that year. Until 1849, when religious liberty was granted through the Constitution of 1849, Baptists were fined, imprisoned, and their infants baptized by compulsion. The Baptists were instrumental in the obtaining of religious freedom in Denmark.

The Baptist Union was formed in 1849, and remained a part of the German Baptist Union until 1888. In that year, it was reorganized, influenced by the emigration of Danish Baptists to the United States, and the returning influence of American Baptists on the Danish. The New Hampshire Confession of Faith was adopted in place of the German Confession of 1847. A number of Danish pastors studied at Morgan Park Seminary in Chicago, Illinois. In 1918, they established their own theological seminary.

Doctrinally, the Danish Baptists have evolved from a generally Calvinistic closed Baptist tradition to a more Arminian ecumenical body. Open communion has been practiced since the 1930s, and today they occasionally accept members from pedobaptist traditions. These Baptists have also changed from a membership of mostly farmers and laborers to an upper middle class membership.

The Baptist Union of Denmark is a member of the European Baptist Federation, the Baptist World Alliance, and the World Council of Churches. According to the Union, membership in 2008 included 5260 members in 50 congregations. Headquarters of the Union are maintained in Copenhagen. The theological seminary is located in Tølløse. Baptists make up only a small representation of Christianity in Denmark, which is predominantly Evangelical Lutheran (the state religion).

References

Baptists Around the World, by Albert W. Wardin, Jr.

External links
 Baptistkirken i Danmark – in Danish
 Baptist Theological Seminary – in Danish
 

Protestantism in Denmark
Members of the World Council of Churches
Religious organizations established in 1849
Baptist denominations in Europe
1848 establishments in Denmark